Patricia Carmel Dawson (born 9 July 1959) is an Australian former cricketer who played as a right-handed batter and occasional wicket-keeper. She appeared in six Test matches and four One Day Internationals for Australia in 1984. She played domestic cricket for New South Wales.

References

External links
 
 
 Trish Dawson at southernstars.org.au

1959 births
Living people
Cricketers from Sydney
Australia women Test cricketers
Australia women One Day International cricketers
New South Wales Breakers cricketers